The Cove Football Club is a soccer club based in Adelaide, South Australia. The Cove play in the South Australian State League. The club was established in 1983 and is based at Club Cove in the Adelaide suburb of Hallett Cove in South Australia.

History
Formerly known as The Cove Soccer Club, the club was established in 1983, based at Club Cove, Hallett Cove in South Australia.

The Cove FC has won numerous league titles in its 28-year history in the SAASL. With the introduction of junior teams in 2008, and the senior club now participating in the FFSA State League, the clubs recent growth has been enormous, and continues to go from strength to strength.

The transition between Amateur and Federation football has been a difficult one for the seniors  as the differences between the standards of football have proven to be quite substantial. Following the appointment of Danny Graystone in 2010 the Seniors have started to progress at a steady rate with the 2011 season bringing the club its longest Federation Cup run in its history knocking out eventual Premier League Champions Enfield City en route and the club now attracting Federation players from clubs such as Adelaide City, Adelaide Galaxy, Cumberland and overseas.

Juniors
Following the unification of the club in 2011, the club has set out clear short-term goals and objectives to become the most successful club in South Adelaide . The first objective was to appoint a director of football which has seen senior assistant coach Terry Eadie move into the role. This is a significant step for the club as for the first time the coaches who coach within the club will be subject to assessment and ongoing training to ensure that the future senior players of the club receive the best youth development on offer.

First Team

References

External links
 Official website

Soccer clubs in Adelaide
Soccer clubs in South Australia
Association football clubs established in 1983
1983 establishments in Australia